Murdoch Macfarlane Dickie (28 December 1919 – February 2004) was a Scottish footballer who played for Crewe Alexandra, Port Vale, Guildford City, Chelsea, and Bournemouth & Boscombe Athletic.

Career
Dickie played for Crewe Alexandra before joining Port Vale in May 1939. He played two league games, but had his contract cancelled in December 1939. After guesting for Walsall during the war he rejoined Vale in October 1944. He played three war league matches before moving on to Guildford City, probably in the autumn of 1945. He played one First Division game for Billy Birrell's Chelsea in 1946–47. He then left Stamford Bridge, and signed with Bournemouth & Boscombe Athletic. He scored twice in 16 league games in 1947–48, helping Harry Lowe's "Cherries" to a second-place finish in the Third Division South. Dickie then left both Dean Court and the English Football League.

Career statistics
Source:

Honours
Bournemouth & Boscombe Athletic
Football League Third Division South second-place promotion: 1947–48

References

1919 births
2004 deaths
Sportspeople from Dumbarton
Footballers from West Dunbartonshire
Scottish footballers
Association football midfielders
Crewe Alexandra F.C. players
Port Vale F.C. players
Guildford City F.C. players
Chelsea F.C. players
AFC Bournemouth players
English Football League players